The women's 3 metre springboard competition of the diving events at the 2011 World Aquatics Championships was held on July 22 with the preliminary round and the semifinal and the final on 23 July.

Medalists

Results
The preliminary round was held on July 22 at 10:00. The semifinal was held on July 22 at 14:00. The final was held on July 23 at 17:00.

Green denotes finalists

Blue denotes semifinalists

References

External links
2011 World Aquatics Championships: Women's 3 m springboard start list, from OmegaTiming.com; retrieved 2011-07-17.

Women's 3 m springboard
Aqua